Space Rangers is an American futuristic science fiction drama. The series aired on CBS in 1993. The show was created by Pen Densham and Trilogy Entertainment Group.

Synopsis 
In the year 2104, the Earth colony Fort Hope on the distant planet Avalon struggles to survive. A small force of police/marines called the "Space Rangers Corps" are the first, last and only line of defense for the colonists against crime and the perils of interstellar exploration. The series concentrates on Captain John Boon and his team of Rangers aboard Ranger Slingship #377.

Cast 

 Jeff Kaake as Captain John Boon
 Jack McGee as Doc Kreuger
 Marjorie Monaghan as Jojo Thorsen
 Cary-Hiroyuki Tagawa as Zylyn
 Danny Quinn as Daniel Kincaid
 Clint Howard as Dr Mimmer
 Linda Hunt as Commander Chennault
 Gottfried John as Colonel Erich Weiss

Planets 
 New Venus -A former Earth colony that was overrun with Banshees. While most of the men elected to abandon the colony, the women chose to stay and fight off the invaders. As a result the colony became an Amazon-like matriarchy. Jojo Thorsen originates from this colony and harbors a deep hatred for Banshees.
 Skaraab -A desolate planet where the days are so hot that the suns burn away all surface life in a matter of one day. The planet's vegetation has to grow back overnight and is so aggressive that it will even consume animal tissue in order to survive. It is also home to an ancient Graaka burial temple.
 Earth -Home to the Space Rangers Corps & its Central Command. It is several weeks away at lightspeed from Fort Hope.
 Avalon -Home to our heroes' colony of Fort Hope. On the outside it looks much like the Painted Desert in the American southwest.
 Katraz -Penal colony. A place where the galaxy's worst are dumped off never to be heard from again. There are no guards and no ways to leave. The planet is ruled by anarchy among the inmates. One inmate named Rec heads the majority of factions on the planet. The name is no doubt derived from the former San Francisco prison of Alcatraz Island which also had the reputation for being impossible to escape.
 Blood Nebula -A favorite hiding spot for smugglers and slavers. Its red clouds jam most sensors making enforcement in this area difficult at best.
 Vee'Lon Prime -A wet, sandy, and tropical planet home to the reptilian Vee'Lons.

Episodes

Media
The complete series was released for a short time on VHS tape. It was later released to DVD for Region 2.

On October 15, 2013, Mill Creek Entertainment released the complete series on DVD in Region 1. Oddly, the Mill Creek release contains two DVDs but contains all six episodes highly compressed onto the first disk, while the second disk has the same six episodes combined into three mini-movies of two episodes each. Furthermore, the Mill Creek release specifies a different episode order list versus the Episodes list above. The Mill Creek release specifies the order as:
 "Pilot"
 "The Replacements"
 "Banshees"
 "Death Before Dishonor"
 "The Trial"
 "To Be Or Not To Be"
It is not specified on the DVD package why the episodes are in this order on the DVD.

See also

Star Rangers, a comic series from 1987–88 with similar characters and concepts.

References

External links 

Marjorie Monaghan's (Jojo) website on Space Rangers

Space adventure television series
CBS original programming
1990s American science fiction television series
1993 American television series debuts
1993 American television series endings
1990s American drama television series
Television series set in the 22nd century
Television shows scored by Hans Zimmer